The Jewish Relief Agency (JRA) is a charitable organization and independent 501(c)(3) nonprofit organization), that serves over 6,000 diverse low-income individuals across Greater Philadelphia by relieving hunger, improving lives, and strengthening our community.

JRA's work is fueled by volunteers who serve those in need in a variety of ways – including, packing and delivering a box of food, giving seniors and the disabled rides to the doctor and grocery store, making friendly visits to isolated members of the community, and more. JRA volunteers come from many backgrounds, ages, and abilities. This includes a wide range of community organizations including Jewish camps, Hillel branches, synagogues and churches, colleges, schools, corporations and others. On average, 1,000 volunteers participate monthly to pack and deliver food packages at JRA's Food Distributions.

Founding and history 
In an attempt to fill the aid gap they saw in the Greater Philadelphia Jewish community, the Agency was founded in September 2000 by Marc Erlbaum and Rabbi Menachem Schmidt. They began with three volunteers serving 19 Russian speaking families with just one U-haul truck and food purchased from BJs. Today, JRA serves over 6,000 individuals of all backgrounds in more than 3,200 households.

Services and volunteer opportunities 
JRA provides many services to its recipients, and primarily through volunteer participation. JRA recipients are eligible for services if their household income is within 150% of the Federal Poverty Level and they live in JRA's service area (some exceptions may apply based on need).

JRA services include the following:

 A monthly supplemental box of Kosher pantry staples and fresh produce (from September through May)     delivered directly to your door by one of our friendly volunteers.
 Donated household items, toiletries, kids' apparel (through a partnership with Cradles to Crayons), diapers and adult incontinence supplies.
 Other services, dependent on volunteer availability.

JRA expansion locations 
Various communities, inspired by JRA's work in the Greater Philadelphia region, have opened JRA programs in their locations including Chicago, Greenwich, Connecticut, Pittsburgh, MetroWest New Jersey, and South Jersey. These programs are operated independently of the Philadelphia organization.

References

External links 
 Jewish Relief Agency
 Jewish Federation of Greater Philadelphia
 Federation Housing, Inc.
 JEVS Human Services

Organizations based in Philadelphia
Jewish charities based in the United States
Jewish community organizations
Montgomery County, Pennsylvania
Chabad organizations
Charities based in Pennsylvania
Jews and Judaism in Philadelphia
Chabad in the United States